Heydar Mosque is an Azerbaijani mosque named after Heydar Aliyev (who preceded his son as president of Azerbaijan), in the Binəqədi raion of Baku. It officially opened on 26 December 2014. 

The mosque covers a total area of 12,000 m2 and the internal area of the building covers a total area of 4,200 square meters. Verses from The Quran are written on the side of the mosque's domes.    

The Caucasian Muslim Office appointed Imam Hafiz Abbasov and Akhund Rufet Garayev for the Sunni and Shia sects, respectively. 

Mubariz Gurbanli, the Chairman to the State Committee on Religious Associations of the Republic of Azerbaijan said that Heydar Mosque is a separate complex. This building is attached to the Executive Power of Baku City and managed on the basis of relevant regulations.

History 
The order to build the Heydar Mosque was given by Ilham Aliyev, president and the son of the mosque's namesake, in mid-2012. Construction work began in September 2012 and was completed at the end of 2014. The official opening ceremony of the mosque took place on 26 December 2014, in which Ilham Aliyev, his spouse Mehriban Aliyeva, the Chairman of the Coordinating Council of the Muftis of the North Caucasus and the Mufti of Karachay-Cherkessia Ismail Berdyev, the Head of the Diocese of Baku and Azerbaijan of the Russian Orthodox Church Father Alexander, Chairman of the Baku Religious Community of Mountain Jews Melih Evdaev, Plenipotentiary Representative of the Office of Muslims of the Caucasus in the Russian Federation Shafik Pshikhachev and chairman of the Caucasian Muslims Office Sheikh-ul-Islam Allahshukur Pashazade took part.

See also 
 Architecture in Azerbaijan
 Mosques in Azerbaijan
 Juma mosque

References 

 Mosques in Baku